Todd Clarke (born 28 April 1951) is an Australian former association football player.

Playing career

Club career
Clarke played in the South Australian state league for Adelaide Beograd before moving to Sydney where he played for NSW state league team Hakoah in 1976. He continued with the club, renamed Sydney City, as they joined the then-new National Soccer League in 1977.

International career
Playing against China in 1975, Clarke made the first of 21 full international appearances for Australia. His last match was in Sydney against Greece in 1978.

References

1951 births
Living people
Australian soccer players
Australia international soccer players
National Soccer League (Australia) players
FK Beograd (Australia) players
Association football goalkeepers
Hakoah Sydney City East FC players